No Man's Land, also known as No Man's Land: Fight for your Rights!, is a 2003 real-time strategy video game for Microsoft Windows developed by Related Designs and published by CDV Software.

Gameplay
The game is set in the new world where the players can play as one of the six factions. Playable factions are the English, Spaniards, American Patriots, American Settlers, Woodland Native Americans, and Prairie Native Americans. Every faction has its own strength and weaknesses and heroes.
The single player contains three campaigns.

Campaigns:
 In the first campaign called The Conquest of a New World the players fight as the Spaniards led by Captain Carnivez against the English and native tribes. 
 In the second campaign The called Fight against The Intruders the players take the role of the natives and fight against European intruders. The first half focuses on Magua and the Iroquois fighting against the English. The second half jumps many years ahead in which Grass Wing of the Cheyenne fights against American Settlers and their allied natives. 
 The last and third campaign called The birth of a nation follows the Sanders family. The first part follows Jerimiah Sanders and takes place during the English Colonization of America in which English pilgrims fight through Spanish en route and unruly natives on American lands. The second part follows Samuel Sanders during the American Revolutionary War in which he must lead American forces against the British, even seeking help from Magua, chieftain of the Iroquois. The third and final part follows William "Billy" Sanders as he and his settlers compete to build a railroad before his opponent does while dealing with hostile natives.

Reception

The game received mainly mixed to positive reviews. On Metacritic, it holds an aggregate score of 70 out of 100, based on twelve reviews. On GameRankings, it holds a score of 65.86%, based on fourteen reviews.

References

External links

2003 video games
Real-time strategy video games
Video games about the American Revolution
Video games developed in Germany
Windows games
Windows-only games
Western (genre) video games
Multiplayer and single-player video games
CDV Software Entertainment games